Slang is the use of informal words and expressions in certain social settings.

Slang may also refer to:

 Slang (album), by Def Leppard
Slang (song), a song off the above mentioned album
 S-Lang (programming language), an array-based scripting language
 S-Lang (programming library), the S-Lang programmer's library
 S (programming language), a statistical processing language and precursor to R